= Qeema Najafi =

Iraqi dish

Qeema Najafi (Arabic: قيمة نجفي) is a traditional Najafi Iraqi dish that is widely popular in Iraq, including in cities such as Baghdad, Karbala, Najaf, and many other Iraqi cities. It was first prepared by the people of Najaf in Iraq. It differs in its method of preparation from Qeema, one of the most famous stews in Iraq and Iran.
